The men's sanda 65 kilograms competition at the 2014 Asian Games in Incheon, South Korea will be held from 20 September to 24 September at the Ganghwa Dolmens Gymnasium.

Sanda is an unsanctioned fight is a Chinese self-defense system and combat sport. Amateur Sanda allows kicks, punches, knees (not to the head), and throws.

A total of 15 men from 15 different countries competed in this event, limited to fighters whose body weight was less than 65 kilograms.

Mohsen Mohammadseifi from Iran won the gold medal after beating Rishat Livensho of Kazakhstan in gold medal bout 2–0, Mohammadseifi won both periods by the same score of 5–0.

Schedule
All times are Korea Standard Time (UTC+09:00)

Results
Legend
KO — Won by knockout
TV — Technical victory

References

External links
Official website

Men's sanda 65 kg